Wilcannia Airport (IATA: WIO, ICAO: YWCA) is an airport located near the town of Wilcannia, New South Wales, Australia. The airport is 9 kilometers (6 miles) from the center of Wilcannia, and is the sole airport serving it. The airport does not service scheduled commercial traffic.

See also 
 List of airports in Australia
 List of airports in New South Wales

References

Airports in New South Wales